Bắc Sơn is a rural district of Lạng Sơn province in the Northeast region of Vietnam. As of 2003 the district had a population of 65,073. The district covers an area of 698 km2. The district capital lies at Bắc Sơn.

Administrative divisions
Bắc Sơn, Long Đống, Quỳnh Sơn, Bắc Sơn, Hữu Vĩnh, Chiêu Vũ, Hưng Vũ, Trấn Yên, Nhất Tiến, Nhất Hòa, Vũ Lăng, Vũ Sơn, Vũ Lễ, Tân Thành, Tân Hương, Tân Lập, Tân Tri, Chiến Thắng, Đồng Ý, Vạn Thủy.

References

Districts of Lạng Sơn province
Lạng Sơn province